Alexandra Levy, better known by her stage name Ada Lea, is a Canadian musician. Levy is currently signed to Saddle Creek Records. As Ada Lea, Levy has released two albums. The first, what we say in private, was released in 2019. In 2021, Levy released her sophomore album titled one hand on the steering wheel the other sewing a garden.

One Hand on the Steering Wheel was longlisted for the 2022 Polaris Music Prize.

References

Saddle Creek Records artists
Year of birth missing (living people)
Living people
Canadian women singer-songwriters